The Aitchison Baronetcy, of Lemmington in the county of Northumberland, is a title in the Baronetage of the United Kingdom. It was created on 31 January 1938 for Sir Stephen Aitchison, of Lemmington Hall, Northumberland, a Justice of the Peace for the city and county of Newcastle upon Tyne and for Northumberland.

Aitchison baronets, of Lemmington (1938)
Sir Stephen Aitchison, 1st Baronet (1863–1942)
Sir Walter de Lancy Aitchison, 2nd Baronet (1892–1953)
Sir Stephen Charles de Lancy Aitchison, 3rd Baronet (1923–1958)
Sir Charles Walter de Lancy Aitchison, 4th Baronet (born 1951)
The heir apparent is Rory Edward de Lancey Aitchison (born 1986)

Notes

References
Kidd, Charles, Williamson, David (editors). Debrett's Peerage and Baronetage (1990 edition). New York: St Martin's Press, 1990, 

Aitchison